Attila Szili  (born 11 March 1978, in Budapest) is a Hungarian football player.
He was the captain of the Hungary under-20 team which participated in 1997 FIFA World Youth Championship in Malaysia.

References 

federationculsrouges.fr

1978 births
Living people
Footballers from Budapest
Hungarian footballers
Hungary youth international footballers
Hungary under-21 international footballers
Association football midfielders
Újpest FC players
Hungarian expatriate footballers
Expatriate footballers in Germany
TSV 1860 Munich II players
Hungarian expatriate sportspeople in Germany
Vasas SC players
Ferencvárosi TC footballers
Budapest Honvéd FC players
Expatriate footballers in France
FC Rouen players
Hungarian expatriate sportspeople in France
Expatriate footballers in Cyprus
APEP FC players
Hungarian expatriate sportspeople in Cyprus
Atromitos Yeroskipou players
Bajai LSE footballers
Nemzeti Bajnokság I players
Cypriot First Division players
Cypriot Second Division players